This page lists board and card games, wargames, and miniatures games  published in 1972.  For video and console games, see 1972 in video gaming.

Games released or invented in 1972
4000 A.D.
Boggle
Conquest
Don't Give Up The Ship!
Richthofen's War

References

See also
 1972 in video gaming

Games
Games by year